WCWJ (channel 17) is a television station in Jacksonville, Florida, United States, affiliated with The CW. It is owned by Graham Media Group alongside independent station WJXT (channel 4). The two stations share studios at 4 Broadcast Place on the south bank of the St. Johns River in Jacksonville; WCWJ's transmitter is located on Anders Boulevard in the city's Killarney Shores section.

History

As a major network affiliate
The station first signed on the air on February 19, 1966 as WJKS-TV. Founded by Rust Craft Broadcasting, it originally operated as an ABC affiliate; prior to its sign-on, ABC programming had been relegated to off-hours clearances on then-CBS affiliate WJXT (channel 4, now an independent station) and NBC affiliate WTLV (channel 12). It took Jacksonville over 16 years to gain full-time affiliates of all three major networks, which was longer than other cities of its size. However, Jacksonville has always been a medium-sized market because the surrounding suburbs and rural areas were smaller than the city itself.

In March 1979, the Ziff Corporation bought Rust Craft's broadcasting assets, including WJKS, for $89.4 million. On March 31, 1980, WJKS and WTLV swapped network affiliations; WTLV took the ABC affiliation from WJKS, with NBC programming moving to WJKS. At the time, ABC was the highest-rated broadcast television network in the United States, while NBC was mired in last place in the ratings.

Media General acquired WJKS from the Ziff Corporation for $18 million in October 1982, as part of the latter company's sale of its six television stations in order to focus on its magazine assets. WJKS became the second television station to be owned by Media General (the first being the company's flagship station WFLA-TV, across the state in Tampa). On April 3, 1988, WTLV and WJKS officially reversed the 1980 affiliation swap between the two stations, with WJKS aligning with ABC once again and WTLV returning to NBC. By this time, NBC had emerged as the top-rated American broadcast network, while ABC had dropped to second place.

The WB affiliation
In May 1994, Birmingham ABC affiliate WBRC was sold to New World Communications, which signed an affiliation agreement with eleven other stations which would become Fox affiliates. WBRC was placed in a blind trust in the fall of 1994, as the Federal Communications Commission (FCC) prohibited a company from owning more than twelve television stations at the time. That station was sold to Fox directly in July 1995, but Fox was forced to run it as an ABC affiliate for over a year after the sale, as WBRC's affiliation contract with ABC did not expire until August 1996. Before WBRC became a Fox owned-and-operated station, Allbritton Communications purchased WCFT-TV and WJSU-TV, and made them full power satellites of WBMA-LP; this prompted Allbritton to sign a groupwide affiliation deal with ABC. As part of the deal, Allbritton-owned WBSG-TV in Brunswick, Georgia (now Ion Television affiliate WPXC-TV) was to become the  ABC affiliate for Jacksonville. 

This posed a problem for the network, as WBSG-TV's signal only covered the northern portion of the Jacksonville market. As a result, upstart WJXX (channel 25; which was operated by Allbritton under a local marketing agreement with owner WPR, L.P., before the former purchased the station outright in September 1997), which had originally planned to operate as an independent station, was named as Jacksonville's new ABC affiliate effective after the termination of WJKS' affiliation contract with the network in January 1997. In response to losing the ABC affiliation, Media General quickly signed an affiliation agreement with The WB. 

In the fall of 1996, WJKS began phasing out ABC programming, with the intent of joining The WB in February; the station's news department would also cease operations. It only cleared 10 hours of primetime programming per week, along with ABC's soaps and news programming. Notably, none of ABC's new shows for the 1996-97 season aired on channel 17. The pre-emoted shows were replaced with programming from The WB, along with syndicated shows. 

However, WJXX was not slated to sign on until April 1. At ABC's request, Allbritton/WPR moved WJXX's launch date up to February 9, even though its full-power facility hadn't been approved yet. WBSG-TV, which WJKS had replaced as the area's WB affiliate, joined ABC on the same day as a semi-satellite of WJXX. The day after WJXX signed on, WJKS changed its call letters to WJWB.

Having been on the air for over 30 years at the time of the affiliation switch, WJWB was one of the few stations to switch from a "big three" network to The WB, which had started operations in January 1995. During the network's first two years, WBSG-TV served as the network's affiliate for the entire Jacksonville market, although cable companies on the Florida side of the market also received WB programming via the superstation feed of Chicago's WGN-TV (which was dropped after the September 1998 launch of The WB 100+ Station Group). Under normal circumstances, the switch could have spelled trouble for channel 17. Not only had it languished in the ratings during its second tenure with ABC, but it now faced having to acquire an additional 10 hours of programming per day—a significant amount even for an owner with Media General's wealth and resources. With the pressure off to compete in full with the market's larger stations and no longer having to maintain a news operation with little viewership, however, WJWB took advantage of the opportunity. For most of The WB's run, WJWB consistently ranked as one of the network's highest-rated affiliates. While WJWB prospered as a WB affiliate, WJXX never recovered from its rushed sign-on. Allbritton gave up and sold the station to WTLV's owner, Gannett, in late 1999.

CW affiliation and sale to Nexstar
On January 24, 2006, the Warner Bros. unit of Time Warner and CBS Corporation announced that the two companies would shut down The WB and UPN and combine the networks' respective programming to create a new "fifth" network called The CW. On February 22, 2006, News Corporation announced the launch of a new "sixth" network called MyNetworkTV, which would be operated by Fox Television Stations and its syndication division Twentieth Television, to give UPN and WB stations that would not become CW affiliates another option besides converting to independent stations. On paper, WJWB seemed to be the obvious choice as Jacksonville's CW affiliate. Network officials were on record as wanting the "strongest" WB and UPN stations by total-day viewership, and UPN had been relegated to off-hours clearances on Fox affiliate WAWS (channel 30, now WFOX-TV) after its charter affiliate and WAWS sister station WTEV-TV (channel 47, now WJAX-TV) dropped the network to join CBS in July 2002 following a compensation and programming dispute with WJXT and its owner Post-Newsweek Stations (now Graham Media Group). However, when The CW announced its initial group of affiliates outside of those owned by the Tribune Company and network sister company CBS Television Stations, WJWB was not included on the list, leading to speculation that The CW would choose to affiliate with independent station WJXT instead.

On April 3, 2006, The CW signed affiliation agreements with WJWB and UPN-affiliated Asheville, North Carolina sister station WASV (now WYCW). On May 26, WJWB changed its callsign to WCWJ to reflect its pending affiliation. The station launched a "Farewell To The Frog Tour", as the WB network and station mascot Michigan J. Frog was retired over the summer. A series of humorous promos later chronicled the frog's failed attempts to find work at several Jacksonville area businesses. The station began changing its branding in mid-August, which included IDs featuring the logos of both The WB and The CW. The affiliation switch took place upon the network's September 18 launch; MyNetworkTV initially ended up as a secondary affiliation on WAWS, before moving to a second digital subchannel of that station in January 2007.

On October 29, 2007, Media General announced that the company was exploring the sale of WCWJ. On January 28, 2009, Nexstar Broadcasting Group announced that it had reached an agreement to purchase WCWJ. The deal was finalized on May 1, 2009. As a result, WCWJ became the first CW affiliate to be owned and operated directly by Nexstar (Nexstar later acquired three other CW affiliates along with one CW-affiliated digital subchannel from Newport Television and until November 2015, held the license assets of CW affiliate WLYH-TV in Harrisburg, Pennsylvania through a shared services agreement with the Sinclair Broadcast Group) and at the time, became Nexstar's largest television station by market size (a distinction now held by Los Angeles CW affiliate KTLA). The WCWJ website was redesigned almost immediately after Nexstar closed on its purchase.

Sale to Graham Media Group
On May 27, 2016, Nexstar announced that it would sell WCWJ, along with WSLS-TV in Roanoke, Virginia, to the Graham Media Group for $120 million as part of the station divestitures required as a result of Nexstar's pending acquisition of WCWJ's former owner Media General. The sale was approved by the FCC on January 11, 2017 and completed January 17, making WCWJ part of a duopoly (Graham Media's first) with WJXT. Soon afterward, WCWJ's former website closed down, replaced by a section on WJXT's website.

Programming

Local programming
The station produces several original programs including the music program YourJax Music (which also has a weeknight-only spinoff series, YourJax Music Vault), the region's first and only local reality TV series Life & Grind: Duval, produced by local musician Dez Nado, and the lifestyle programs Local Haunts and I Know Jax (two magazine-style programs focusing on Jacksonville area tourist attractions); it also carries local sporting events from the Jacksonville RollerGirls roller derby team, Jacksonville Giants American Basketball Association, Jacksonville University Dolphins college football, and Jacksonville Armada FC soccer teams.

Newscasts

WJKS started a small news operation in its second year of operation. Its newscasts went under various titles during the duration of the news department's existence including WJKS-TV News, Pulse News, NewsWatch 17, 17 News and then finally 17 First Coast News. In addition, the station produced a Sunday evening public affairs discussion program titled Face Off for several years. In 1991, WJKS established a news share agreement with Fox affiliate WAWS to produce a half-hour prime time newscast for that station (titled Fox 30 First Coast News) that aired at 10 p.m. seven nights a week. Throughout the news department's existence, WJKS's newscasts typically placed last in the ratings among the three local news outlets that existed in Jacksonville prior to 1997, behind WTLV and perennial first-place finisher WJXT.

After the announcement that WJKS would lose its ABC affiliation to upstart WJXX, then-owner Media General announced in September 1996 that it would shut down the station's news department, claiming that it would be not be viable to continue producing newscasts as an affiliate of The WB. This came despite the fact that WB-affiliated stations in other markets—largely those owned by Tribune Broadcasting and Sinclair Broadcast Group, as well as one of the stations that took over the ABC affiliation from WJKS, WBSG—established their own or maintained existing news departments during their network tenures. However, many of these stations were in markets that were somewhat larger than Jacksonville, and were upstart operations with realistic expectations of only competing in the 10 p.m. timeslot, rather than long-struggling departments with little hope of overcoming the larger stations in traditional dayparts. The station's final newscast and the final edition of Face Off both aired on December 29, 1996. The WJKS-produced 10:00 p.m. newscast on WAWS was discontinued as a result; WAWS established its own in-house news department in response, which debuted on December 30, the day after channel 17's news department folded. When Gannett, owner of WTLV, bought WJXX in 1999 and merged the operations of the two stations, the joint news department that resulted was titled First Coast News.

From that time until the Graham Media acquisition, channel 17 was the only commercial television station in the Jacksonville market that did not air locally produced newscasts, either produced by the station itself or through one of the three news departments operated amongst the five other network affiliates in the area. However, the station did carry the first hour of The Daily Buzz on weekday mornings until the program's cancellation in April 2015.

Graham Media purchased WCWJ in January 2017, forming a duopoly with WJXT, which produces the highest output of local news programming in Jacksonville. WCWJ currently airs simulcasts of WJXT's newscasts, including the first two hours of The Morning Show from 7 to 9 a.m. on weekdays, and weekend editions of its 11 p.m. newscast on Saturdays and Sundays.

Notable former on-air staff
 Sam Champion – former managing editor for The Weather Channel and host of AMHQ; later with ABC News' Good Morning America as a weather expert, now with WABC-TV
 Doug McKelway – now with TBN

Technical information

Subchannels
The station's digital signal is multiplexed:

Analog-to-digital conversion
On June 12, 2009, WCWJ terminated its analog signal, on UHF channel 17, as part of the federally mandated transition from analog to digital television. The station's digital signal remained on its pre-transition UHF channel 34. Through the use of PSIP, digital television receivers display WCWJ's virtual channel as 17.

References

External links

WJKS station history

CWJ
The CW affiliates
Bounce TV affiliates
Movies! affiliates
GetTV affiliates
Graham Media Group
Television channels and stations established in 1966
2017 mergers and acquisitions
1966 establishments in Florida